Ikuo (written: 郁夫, 育夫, 征夫 or 幾雄) is a masculine Japanese given name. Notable people with the name include:

, member of Aum Shinrikyo
, Japanese painter
, Japanese politician
, Japanese politician
, Japanese footballer and manager
, Japanese photographer
, Japanese voice actor
, Japanese film director and screenwriter
Ikuo Shirahama (born 1958), Japanese golfer
, Japanese footballer
, Japanese academic

Japanese masculine given names